Jesús Rueda Azcuaga (born in Madrid, 30 May 1961) is a Spanish composer. He won the 2004 National Prize for the global quality of his music, with special recognition to his recently premiered symphonic and chamber compositions, such as his Symphony No. 2 and his String Quartet No. 3. His Symphony No. 3, Viaje imaginario (dedicated to his teacher Francisco Guerrero following his death) and a selection of his piano music, including his two sonatas, were subsequently published by Naxos Records.

Through his career he has evolved from experimental music to a more mainstream style. He is the resident composer of the Cadaqués Orchestra, and a regular juror of the Queen Sofía Prize.

Compositions

Opera
 Fragmento de Orfeo (2006)

Orchestral
 Fons Vitae (1994)
 Viaje imaginario (1998)
 Jardín mecánico (1999)
 Symphony No. 1 ″Laberinto″ (2000)
 Hyperión 1 (2001)
 Symphony No. 2 ″Acerca del límite″ (2002)
 Elephant Skin (2002)
 El viaje múltiple (2005)
 Symphony No. 3 ″Luz″ (2006)
 Hyperión 2 (2006)
 La Tierra (2006)
 Symphony No. 4 ″July″ (2017)
 Divertimento (2018)
 Stairscape (2018)
 Symphony No. 5 ″Naufragios″ (2019)
 Symphony No. 6 ″Fuga en las tinieblas″ (2020)
 Symphony No. 7 ″Northern Visions″ (2021)
 Symphony No. 8 “Elegy”  (2021)
 Symphony No. 9 “Oblivion” (2022)
 Symphony No. 10 “La era real” (2022)

Concertante

Piano

 Cadenza (1997)

Ensemble
 Chamber Concerto No. 1 ″Présages″ (1990)
 Mas la noche (1991)
 Arrecife (1992)
 Un vent noire (1992)
 Dos sonetos (1993)
 Chamber Concerto No. 2 (1997)
 Chamber Concerto No. 3 ″En el Corral de Comedias de Almagro″ (2001)

Chamber music
 Microsecuencias (1985)
 YAM (1986)
 String Quartet No. 1 (1990)
 Una leyenda (1990)
 Sinamay (1991)
 Bitácora, for piano quintet (1992)
 Ítaca (1997)
 Perpetuum Mobile for percussion duo (1998)
 El diario de Fausto (1999)
 Memoria del laberinto (2000)
 String Quartet No. 2 ″Desde las sombras″ (2003)
 3 Expressive Etudes for steel drums (2004)
 String Quartet No. 3 ″Islas″ (2004)
 8 Love Songs (2004)
 Obsesión (2004)
 Pocket Paradise (2008)
 Your Story (2014)
 Absolute! (2014)
 The Messenger (2015)
 Persiles (2016)
 Holstebro Quintet, for piano quintet (2016)
 String Quartet No. 4 ″Still Life″ (2018)
 Natura Morta (2019)
 String Quartet No. 5 ″Fragments″ (2019)
 String Quartet No. 6 ″The Glare″ (2019)
 String Quartet No. 7 ″The Journey″ (2020)
 String Quartet No. 8 ″Nostalgia″ (2020)
 String Quartet No. 9 ″Metamorphosis″ (2020)
 String Quartet No. 10 ″Copenhagen″ (2020)
 String Quartet No. 11 "On the way of Bee" (2021)
 String Quartet No. 12 "Afterthoughs" (2021)
 String Quartet No. 13 "Madrid" (2021)
 String Quartet No. 14 "Good Old Days (Rome)" (2021)
 String Quartet No. 15 "The Endless Shore" (2021)
 String Quartet No. 16 "Las semanas del jardín" (2022)
 String Quartet No. 17 "Nothingness" (2022)

Vocal
 Salmo Responsoriale (2000)

Solo

Cello

 Io (1989)

Flute

 Suspiria (1988)
 Vértigo (1992)

Guitar

 Remembrance (1996)
 Quaderno d'Estate (2007)

Percussion

 Luna nueva (2000)
 6 Inventions for young accordionists (2004)
 Etude for marimba (2007)

Piano

 Six Etudes (1989)
 Ricercata (1995)
 Mephisto (1999)
 24 Interludes (2003)
 29 Inventions (2003)
 Piano Sonata No. 1 (2004)
 Piano Sonata No. 2 ″Ketjak″ (2007)
 Impromptu No. 4 ″RoMa″ (2009)
 Five Impromptus (2009)
 Piano Sonata No. 3 “Upon a Ground” (2016)
 Piano Sonata No. 4 “Night Thoughts” (2017)
 Piano Sonata No. 5 “The Butterfly Effect” (2018)
 Piano Sonata No. 6 “On the Edge” (2018)
 Piano Sonata No. 7 “Isola T.” (2022)
 Piano Sonata No. 8 “Plaka” (2022)

Violin

 Sex Machine (2007)

Electronic music
 Synthiludia (1985)
 Sobre un fondo de luto descolorido (1986)
 Fragmento final (1987)
 Voyager (1988)
 Estacionario (fantasy for piano and electronics) (1989)

References

1961 births
Living people
Spanish composers
Spanish male composers